The Star Inn is a gastropub/restaurant located in the village of Harome near Helmsley  in North Yorkshire, England. The pub has been in the village since the 19th century  and the building dates back to the 14th century. It has been known for the quality of its food since the 1970s. The current owner is Andrew Pern who took over in 1996 originally with his then wife, Jacquie Pern. He has continued the tradition for quality food, gaining several awards. , the restaurant holds one star in the Michelin Guide, an award it regained in 2014 having previously held it from 2002 to 2011.

The building was designated as a Grade II listed building in January 1955. The pub was badly damaged by a fire in November 2021.

Selected awards
2014 – One Michelin star
2008 – Pub Chef Awards – Gastropub of the year
2006 – Egon Ronay Guide Gastropub of the year
2005 – Good Pub Guide "Inn of the Year".

Fire
On 24 November 2021, the roof of The Star Inn caught fire around 10 pm that evening. Head chef and owner Andrew Pern told BBC Radio York that the thatched roof created a "perfect fuel" for a fire. The official Twitter account for the restaurant posted "We won't be open for a while as we are reduced to ashes with The Star on fire and still burning." It is estimated getting the restaurant back to business will take about a year.  The fire is believed to be a case of arson.  North Yorkshire Police said, “A number of groups of people were in the area around the time of the fire, and police are urging anyone with information about the incident to contact them” or telephone Crimestoppers anonymously.

In September 2022, it was announced that The Star Inn would partially reopen from the 1 October 2022.

References

External links

 Official website

Restaurants in Yorkshire
Gastropubs in England
Michelin Guide starred restaurants in the United Kingdom
Grade II listed pubs in North Yorkshire